Flatbush Cats is a non-profit organization in Flatbush, Brooklyn specializing in cat rescue. The organization employs trap–neuter–return and adoption programs to reduce the stray cat population in Flatbush. Flatbush Cats has a substantial social media following and relies heavily on volunteers, with The Guardian describing the organization as being one of the most effective crowd-sourced rescue efforts in New York City.

Description 
Flatbush Cats was established by Will Zweigart in 2017. The organization conducts trap–neuter–return operations to help manage the stray and feral cat population in Brooklyn's Flatbush neighborhood; this method helps to reduce the effects of cat overpopulation in the dense urban landscape of New York City. Flatbush Cats also provides training services for volunteers who want to employ trap–neuter–return. In addition to trap–neuter–return, the organization provides adoption, fostering, and medical services for stray cats and kittens. The organization saw a large increase in its workload during the COVID-19 pandemic, during which event the City of New York had cut funding for other programs working to control the city's cat population.

The organization is a 501(c)(3) organization and relies entirely on donations for funding. Flatbush Cats also relies heavily on volunteers in the Flatbush neighborhood. The organization has relatively large social media presence, maintaining an Instagram account and YouTube channel.

External links 
Twitter
Instagram
Website

References 

Animal rescue groups
2017 establishments in New York City
Non-profit organizations based in Brooklyn